The 2010 China Masters Super Series was a top level badminton competition which was held from September 14, 2010 to September 19, 2010 in Changzhou, China. It was the seventh BWF Super Series competition on the 2010 BWF Super Series schedule. The total purse for the event was $250,000.

Men's singles

Seeds
 Lee Chong Wei (withdrew)
 Taufik Hidayat (withdrew)
 Chen Jin
 Lin Dan
 Bao Chunlai
 Boonsak Ponsana
 Chen Long
 Jan Ø. Jørgensen

Results

Women's singles

Seeds
 Wang Yihan
 Wang Xin
 Wang Shixian
 Tine Baun
 Pi Hongyan
 Jiang Yanjiao
 Bae Youn-joo
 Wang Lin

Results

Men's doubles

Seeds
 Fang Chieh-min / Lee Sheng-mu
 Guo Zhendong / Xu Chen
 Jung Jae-sung / Lee Yong-dae
 Ko Sung-hyun / Yoo Yeon-seong
 Cai Yun / Fu Haifeng
 Cho Gun-woo / Kwon Yi-goo
 Kim Ki-jung / Shin Baek-cheol
 Chai Biao / Zhang Nan

Result

Women's doubles

Seeds
 Cheng Wen-hsing / Chien Yu-chin
 Cheng Shu / Zhao Yunlei
 Petya Nedelcheva / Anastasia Russkikh
 Shinta Mulia Sari / Yao Lei
 Wang Xiaoli / Yu Yang
 Kim Min-jung / Lee Hyo-jung
 Pan Pan / Tian Qing
 Meiliana Jauhari / Greysia Polii

Results

Mixed doubles

Seeds
 Nova Widianto / Lilyana Natsir
 Songphon Anugritayawon / Kunchala Voravichitchaikul
 Sudket Prapakamol / Saralee Thungthongkam
 Lee Sheng-Mu / Chien Yu-Chin
 Chen Hung-Ling / Cheng Wen-Hsing
 Joachim Fischer Nielsen / Christinna Pedersen
 Tao Jiaming / Tian Qing
 He Hanbin / Ma Jin

Results

References

External links
China Masters Super Series 2010 at tournamentsoftware.com

China Masters
China Masters Super Series, 2010
China Masters